Euphyes bimacula, the two-spotted skipper, is a butterfly of the family Hesperiidae. It is found in North America, from northeast Colorado and western Nebraska; eastern Nebraska east to southern Quebec; southern Maine south to central Virginia; coastal plain south to Georgia; and the Gulf Coast.

The wingspan is 25–30 mm. They are dark brown on the upperside and pale tawny orange beneath.

The larvae feed on Carex trichocarpa. Adults feed on nectar from flowers including pickerelweed, sweet pepperbush, blue flag, common milkweed, and spiraea.

The species is listed as endangered in Connecticut by state authorities.

Subspecies
There are three subspecies of E. bimacula:
E. b. arbotsti Gatrelle, 1999
E. b. bimacula (Grote & Robinson, 1867)
E. b. arbotsti (Dodge, 1872)

References

Butterflies of North America
Hesperiini
Butterflies described in 1867
Taxa named by Augustus Radcliffe Grote
Taxa named by Coleman Townsend Robinson